The Samsung Galaxy M14 5G is an Android-based smartphone designed and manufactured by Samsung Electronics. This phone was announced on March 8, 2023.

References 

Android (operating system) devices
Samsung mobile phones
Phablets
Mobile phones introduced in 2023
Samsung Galaxy
Mobile phones with multiple rear cameras